The year 626 BC was a year of the pre-Julian Roman calendar. In the Roman Empire, it was known as year 128 Ab urbe condita . The denomination 626 BC for this year has been used since the early medieval period, when the Anno Domini calendar era became the prevalent method in Europe for naming years.

Events
 Jeremiah begins his ministry in the Kingdom of Judah.
 23 November -- Nabopolassar revolts against his Assyrian overlords, establishing the Neo-Babylonian Empire.

Births

Deaths
 King Cheng of Chu, king of the state of Chu

References